Hogye-dong (호계동, 虎溪洞) is neighborhood of Dongan district in the city of Anyang, Gyeonggi Province, South Korea. It is officially divided into Hogye-1-dong, Hogye-2-dong and Hogye-3-dong.

External links
 Hogye-1-dong 
 Hogye-2-dong 
 Hogye-3-dong 

Dongan-gu
Neighbourhoods in Anyang, Gyeonggi